McAliskey is a surname. Notable people with the surname include:

Bernadette Devlin McAliskey (born 1947), also known as Bernadette Devlin and Bernadette McAliskey, a socialist republican political activist
John McAliskey (born 1984), professional English footballer
Róisín McAliskey (born 1971), Irish political activist and elder daughter of republican activists Bernadette and Michael McAliskey